This is a list of electoral district results for the 1941 Queensland state election.

At the time, the voting system in Queensland was based on contingency voting, which was similar to the modern optional preferential voting system. In electorates with 3 or more candidates, preferences were not distributed if a candidate received more than 50% of the primary vote.

If none received more than 50%, all except the top two candidates were eliminated from the count and their preferences distributed between the two leaders, with the one receiving the most votes declared the winner.

Results by electoral district

Albert

Aubigny

Barcoo

By-election 

 This by-election was caused by the resignation of Frank Bulcock. It was held on 1 May 1943.

Baroona

Bowen

Bremer

Brisbane 

 Preferences were not distributed.

Bulimba

Bundaberg

Buranda

Cairns 

 Preferences were not distributed.

By-election 

 This by-election was caused by the death of John O'Keefe. It was held on 5 November 1942.

Carnarvon

Carpentaria

Charters Towers

Cook

Cooroora

Cunningham

Dalby

East Toowoomba

Enoggera 

 Preferences were not distributed.

Fassifern

Fitzroy

Fortitude Valley

Gregory 

 While Labor had won this seat in the previous election, the Independent had won it in a by-election.

Gympie 

 Preferences were not distributed.

Hamilton

By-election 

 This by-election was caused by the resignation of Bruce Pie. It was held on 9 October 1943.

Herbert 

 Preferences were not distributed.

Ipswich 

 Preferences were not distributed.

Isis

Ithaca 

 Preferences were not distributed.

Kelvin Grove 

 Preferences were not distributed.

Kennedy 

 Preferences were not distributed.

Keppel 

 Preferences were not distributed.

Kurilpa

Logan

Mackay

By-election 

 This by-election was caused by the resignation of William Forgan Smith. It was held on 20 March 1943.

Maranoa

Maree

Maryborough

Merthyr

Mirani

Mundingburra 

 Preferences were not distributed.

Murrumba

Nanango

Normanby

Nundah

Oxley

By-election 

 This by-election was caused by the death of Thomas Nimmo. It was held on 17 April 1943.

Port Curtis

Rockhampton

Sandgate

South Brisbane

Stanley

The Tableland 

 Preferences were not distributed.

Toowong 

 Massey was elected as an Independent at the previous election.

Toowoomba

Townsville

Warrego

By-election 

 This by-election was caused by the death of Randolph Bedford. It was held on 30 August 1941.

Warwick

West Moreton

Wide Bay

Windsor

Wynnum 

 Preferences were not distributed.

See also 

 1941 Queensland state election
 Candidates of the Queensland state election, 1941
 Members of the Queensland Legislative Assembly, 1941-1944

References 

Results of Queensland elections